The 2022 World Bowls Indoor Championships took place at County of Bristol IBC, Bristol, England, from 25 to 29 April 2022. The event was organised by World Bowls and the International Indoor Bowls Council (IIBC).

The Championships are the inaugural edition because two attempts at holding the event in 2020 and 2021 were cancelled due to the COVID-19 pandemic. In 2019, World Bowls came to an agreement with the IIBC (formerly the WIBC). The agreement was to merge their two international indoor championships, the World Cup Singles and the IIBC Championships. The Championships were streamed live by the English Indoor Bowling Association's platform EIBA TV.

The format of the Championships is one player representing each county in the singles and two in the pairs. A round robin will end with the top two in the singles progressing to the knock out rounds but only the group winner in the pairs progressing to the knock out round.

Scottish bowlers dominated the first Championships, with Michael Stepney defeating fellow Scot Stewart Anderson in the men's singles final and Julie Forrest claiming the women's singles final after beating Gloria Ha.

Stewart Anderson and Alison Merrien MBE won the mixed pairs defeating Michael Stepney and Claire Anderson in the final.

Winners

Results

Men's singles
First round

Second round

Quarter finals

Semi finals

Final

Women's singles
First round

Second round

Quarter finals

Semi finals

Final

Mixed pairs
First round

Quarter finals

Semi finals

Final

References

2022 in bowls
World Bowls Indoor Championship
International sports competitions hosted by England
World Bowls Indoor Championship
Sports competitions in Bristol
World Bowls Indoor Championships